Owen McMahon (born 4 August 1970) is an Australian sailor. He competed in the men's 470 event at the 1996 Summer Olympics.

References

External links
 

1970 births
Living people
Australian male sailors (sport)
Olympic sailors of Australia
Sailors at the 1996 Summer Olympics – 470
Sportspeople from Melbourne